WLIQ (1530 AM) is a radio station broadcasting a classic country format. Licensed to Quincy, Illinois, the station is owned by Townsquare Media Group.

References

External links
WLIQ's official website
Townsquare Media Website

LIQ
Townsquare Media radio stations
Radio stations established in 1966
1966 establishments in Missouri
LIQ